Lorraine Patricia Gamman (July 1957) is professor of design at the Design Against Crime Research Centre at Central Saint Martins in the University of the Arts, London which she founded in 1999.

Her taking of the oral history of professional shoplifter Shirley Pitts as part of her PhD kindled her interest in oral history as a form and lead to her book Gone shopping: The story of Shirley Pitts, Queen of thieves. In 2012, the production company Tiger Aspect bought an option to acquire the television and film rights to the book.

Selected publications
 The female gaze. The Women's Press, 1988. (With Margaret Marshment) 
 Female fetishism: A new look. Lawrence & Wishart, 1994. (With Merja Makinen) 
 Gone shopping: The story of Shirley Pitts, Queen of thieves. Signet/Penguin, 1996.  (2nd edition 2012)
 Dirty Washing – The Hidden Language of Soap Powder Boxes, Design Museum 2001 (With Sean O’Mara).
  Built Environment: Sustainability via Security: A New Look, 35 (3), 2009. (Co-edited with Rachel Armitage). ISSN 0263-7960
 Theft of customers’ personal property from cafes and bars. Problem-Oriented Guides for Police, Problem- Specific Guides Series,  Guide no. 60. U.S. Department of Justice, Centre for Problem Oriented Policing, 2010. (With Kate Bowers, Shane Johnson, Loreen Mamerow and Anna Warne). 
 CoDesign -  International Journal of CoCreation in Design and the Arts, 7 (3-4). Special Issue on Socially Responsive Design, 2011. (Co-edited with Adam Thorpe) ISSN 1571-0882

Forthcoming publication
Tricky design: The ethics of things. 2018. (Joint editor with Tom Fisher) 

Gamman has written many journal articles (too numerous to list here) but some of the chapters in books she has written include:
 
 Reviewing Queer Viewing – The Gaze Revisited (With Caroline Evans), 1995. In: A Queer Romance:  Lesbians, Gay Men and Popular Culture (Eds. P. Burston and C. Richardson), Routledge. 
 Visual Seduction and Perverse Compliance: Reviewing Food Fantasies, Hidden Appetites and ‘Grotesque’ Bodies, 2000. In: ‘Fashion Cultures’ (Eds. S. Bruzzi and P. Gibson), Routledge.  
 Self-fashioning and the shoe: what’s at stake in Female Fetishism or Narcissism, 2001. In ‘Footnotes: On Shoes’ (Eds. Suzanne Ferris and Shari Benstock), Rutgers University Press. 
 Criminality and creativity: what’s at stake in designing against crime? (With Adam Thorpe) In: Design Anthropology: Object Culture in the 21st Century. Springer, New York/Vienna, pp. 52-67, 2010. 
 Reviewing the art of crime - what, if anything, do criminals and artists/designers have in common? (With Maziar Raein) In: Cropley, D. et al (Eds.) The Dark Side of Creativity. pp. 155–177. Cambridge: Cambridge University Press 2010. 
 Reducing Handbag Theft, 2012. (With Paul Ekblom, Kate Bowers, Aiden Sidebottom, Chris Thomas, Adam Thorpe and Marcus Willcocks). In: Ekblom, P. (Ed.) Design Against Crime: Crime Proofing Everyday Objects.  Crime Prevention Studies 27. Boulder, Col.: Lynne Rienner. 
 Female Slenderness and the Case of Perverse Compliant Deception - or Why Size Matters... In: Fashion Cultures Revisited: Theories, Explorations and Analysis. Routledge, pp. 296–304, 2013. 
 Could Design Help to Promote and Build Empathic Processes in Prison? Understanding the Role of Empathy and Design in Catalysing Social Change and Transformation. (With Adam Thorpe) In: Transformation Design: Perspectives on a New Design Attitude. Board of International Research in Design, 2015. Birkhäuser/ BIRD, pp. 83-100. 
 Design for Empathy – why participatory design has a contribution to make regarding facilitating restorative values and processes, 2016. (With Adam Thorpe) In: Gavrielides, T. (Ed.) Offenders No More: New Offender Rehabilitation Theory and Practice. NY: Nova Science Pub.  
 What is “Socially Responsive Design and Innovation”?, 2015. (With Adam Thorpe) In: Fisher, F. and Sparke, P. (Eds.) Routledge Companion to Design Studies. Abingdon, Oxon: Routledge. 
 Is Nudge as good as We Think in Designing Against crime? Contrasting Paternalistic and Fraternalistic Approaches to Design for Behaviour Change, 2018 (With Adam Thorpe) pp 216–234. In: Kristina Niedderer, Stephen Clune, Geke Ludden (Eds) Design for Behaviour Change: Theories and practices of designing for change (Design for Social Responsibility).

References 

Living people
Alumni of Middlesex University
Academics of the University of the Arts London
Alumni of the University of Kent
Oral historians
1957 births
People from Hoxton